Vanjanwadi is a village in the Karmala taluka of Solapur district in Maharashtra state, India.

Demographics
Covering  and comprising 221 households at the time of the 2011 census of India, Vanjanwadi had a population of 856. There were 431 males and 425 females, with 70 people being aged six or younger.

References

Villages in Karmala taluka